Nationality words link to articles with information on the nation's poetry or literature (for instance, Irish or France).

Events
 Gavin Douglas completed the Eneados, a complete Scots translation of Virgil's Aeneid and the first full and faithful translation into any Germanic language of a major poem from classical antiquity.
 John Skelton appointed Poet Laureate by Henry VIII of England

Works published

Great Britain
 Anonymous, Ars amatoria, translated from the Latin of Ovid's Art of Love
 John Lydgate, published anonymously, Troy Book, verse paraphrase of Guido delle Colonne's Historia destructionis Troiae of 1287, in turn a Latin prose translation of the Roman de Troie (c. 1165) of Benoit de Sainte-Maure (see also The Life and Death of Hector 1614)
 John Skelton, published anonymously,  celebrating the defeat of the Scots at Flodden

Other
 Mallanarya of Gubbi, Bhava Chintaratna, India
 Tito Vespasiano Strozzi, Strozii poëtae pater et filius, his complete works together with works of his son; published by Aldus Manutius, Italy

Births
Death years link to the corresponding "[year] in poetry" article:
 December 23 – Sir Thomas Smith (died 1577), English scholar, diplomat and poet

Deaths
Birth years link to the corresponding "[year] in poetry" article:
 January – Hans Folz (born c. 1437), German Meistersinger
 Henry Bradshaw (born c. 1450), English
 Robert Fabyan (birth year not known), English chronicler and sheriff
 Bartolomeo Fonzio (born c. 1445), Italian, Latin-language poet
 Naldo Naldi died about this year (born 1436), Italian, Latin-language poet

See also

 Poetry
 16th century in poetry
 16th century in literature
 French Renaissance literature
 Grands Rhétoriqueurs
 Renaissance literature
 Spanish Renaissance literature

Notes

16th-century poetry
Poetry